Maprounea is a plant genus of the family Euphorbiaceae first named as a genus in 1775. It is native to tropical Africa, Trinidad, and tropical Central and South America.

Species
 Maprounea africana - W + C + S Africa, from Benin to Zimbabwe
 Maprounea amazonica - Colombia, Venezuela, N Brazil
 Maprounea brasiliensis - Brazil, Paraguay, Bolivia
 Maprounea guianensis - Trinidad, Panama, Colombia, Venezuela, French Guiana, Suriname, Guyana, Brazil, Peru, Ecuador, Bolivia, Paraguay
 Maprounea membranacea - Nigeria, Cameroon, Gabon, Equatorial Guinea, Cabinda, Central African Republic, Congo, Zaire

Formerly included
moved to Mabea 
Maprounea glauca - Mabea taquari

References

Euphorbiaceae genera
Hippomaneae